Samer al-Masry, also spelled Samer al-Masri, (born 3 August 1969 in Damascus, Syria) is a Syrian actor. He is best known for his lead role in the Syrian drama Bab al-Hara.

Career
Al-Masry has performed in theater and film but is best known for his work in television and his lead role in Bab al-Hara. He has also starred in Orkedia, Jalsat Nisaa'ya, Al Dabour, 'Wajh El Adalah', Abu Janti, and Beit Jidi.

Al-Masry also starred in the Palestinian TV series Yehya Ayash. After Abu Janti 2 in 2012, Samer Al Masri moved to Dubai, in the United Arab Emirates. In 2014, Samer Al-Masry took part in the new movie From A to B alongside Egyptian actor Khaled Abol Naga and Yosra El Lozy. In 2016, Al-Masry starred in the movie 'The Worthy' and The Cell in 2017 along with Egyptian actors Ahmed Ezz and Amina Khalil.

Filmography

Film

Television

References

External links
Associated Press, community.seattletimes.nwsource.com, April 29, 2002, "Syrian play breaks Assad-era political taboos"
The Jerusalem Post, October 13, 2004, "TV drama on Ayyash expected to be Ramadan hit"
albawaba.com, October 23, 2007, "“Bab Al Harah 3” faces problems"
albawaba.com, April 4, 2008, "Jomanah Murad Joins “Bab Al Harah part 3”
albawabd.com, December 12, 2008, "Karris films “Tulip Flower”"

1969 births
Living people
People from Damascus
Syrian male television actors